Shahid Pervez is a Pakistani former cricketer. He played three first-class and five List A matches for Pakistan Automobiles Corporation cricket team between 1983 and 1985.

See also
 List of Pakistan Automobiles Corporation cricketers

References

External links
 

Year of birth missing (living people)
Living people
Pakistani cricketers
Pakistan Automobiles Corporation cricketers
Place of birth missing (living people)